Patrick McManus was a professional rugby league footballer who played in the 1930s.

Playing career

Challenge Cup Final appearances
Patrick McManus played left-, i.e. number 8, in Castleford's 11-8 victory over Huddersfield in the 1935 Challenge Cup Final during the 1934–35 season at Wembley Stadium, London on Saturday 4 May 1935, in front of a crowd of 39,000.

References

External links
Search for "McManus" at rugbyleagueproject.org

Castleford Tigers players
English rugby league players
Great Britain national rugby league team players
Place of birth missing
Place of death missing
Rugby league props
Year of birth missing
Year of death missing